Dirk II or Theoderic II (920/930 – 6 May 988) was a count in West Frisia, and ancestor of the counts of Holland. He was the son and heir of Dirk I and his wife Geva (or Gerberge).

Career
In 983 Emperor Otto III confirmed Dirk's rights within the Duchy of Lower Lorraine to properties and territories in the counties of Maasland, Kinhem (Kennemerland) and Texla (Texel), thus stretching along the entire Hollandic coast, as well as inland. Count Dirk II built a fortress near Vlaardingen, which was later the site of the Battle of Vlaardingen between his grandson Dirk III and an Imperial army under Godfrey II, Duke of Lower Lorraine.

Starting in 950, Dirk II rebuilt Egmond Abbey and its wooden church in stone, in order to house the relics of Saint Adalbert. Adalbert was not well known at that time, but he was said to have preached Christianity in the region two centuries earlier. The abbey was given to a community of Benedictine monks from Ghent, who replaced the nuns originally housed there, probably in the 970s. His daughter Erlint, Erlinde or Herlinde, who was abbess at the time, was made abbess of the newly founded Bennebroek Abbey instead.

Family
Dirk married Hildegarde who is thought to be a daughter of Count Arnulf of Flanders, based on the names of her children. They had three known children. His son Arnulf became Count of Holland and Frisia after Dirk's death.  The younger son Egbert became Archbishop of Trier in 977. His daughter Erlinde (or Herlinde) was an abbess.

Dirk died in 988 and was buried in the stone church at Egmond Abbey. Hildegard died two years later and was also buried there.

References
 Geerts.com: History of Holland
 Frisia Coast Trail: The Abbey of Egmond and the Rise of the Gerulfings

10th-century births
988 deaths
Counts of Holland
Counts of Frisia
10th-century rulers in Europe
Burials at Egmond Abbey